In mathematics, Pascal's rule (or Pascal's formula) is a combinatorial identity about binomial coefficients. It states that for positive natural numbers n and k, 
 

Pascal's rule can also be viewed as a statement that the formula

solves the linear two-dimensional difference equation

over the natural numbers.  Thus, Pascal's rule is also a statement about a formula for the numbers appearing in Pascal's triangle.

Pascal's rule can also be generalized to apply to multinomial coefficients.

Combinatorial proof

Pascal's rule has an intuitive combinatorial meaning, that is clearly expressed in this counting proof.

Proof. Recall that  equals the number of subsets with k elements from a set with n elements. Suppose one particular element is uniquely labeled X in a set with n elements. 

To construct a subset of k elements containing X, include X and choose k − 1 elements from the remaining n − 1 elements in the set. There are  such subsets.

To construct a subset of k elements not containing X, choose k elements from the remaining n − 1 elements in the set. There are  such subsets.

Every subset of k elements either contains X or not. The total number of subsets with k elements in a set of n elements is the sum of the number of subsets containing X and the number of subsets that do not contain X, .

This equals ; therefore, .

Algebraic proof

Alternatively, the algebraic derivation of the binomial case follows.

Generalization
Pascal's rule can be generalized to multinomial coefficients.

The algebraic derivation for this general case is as follows. Then

See also
 Pascal's triangle
 Hockey-stick identity

References

Bibliography

Merris, Russell. Combinatorics. John Wiley & Sons. 2003

External links
 
 

Combinatorics
Mathematical identities
Articles containing proofs